Aslia is a genus of echinoderms belonging to the family Cucumariidae.

The species of this genus are found in the coasts of Atlantic Ocean.

Species:

Aslia forbesi 
Aslia lefevrei 
Aslia pygmaea 
Aslia sanctijohannis 
Aslia spyridophora

References

Cucumariidae
Holothuroidea genera